Brian Trueman (born 16 May 1932) is an English broadcaster, writer and voice actor. He is known mainly for his work with the animation studio Cosgrove Hall. He wrote and/or narrated children's cartoon series, mostly during the 1970s and 1980s.

Career
Trueman's cartoons were originally shown on ITV, in its CITV programming slot. However, he also presented the BBC's children's film quiz Screen Test, taking over from original host Michael Rodd between 1979 and 1983. Prior to taking up a writing career Brian worked for many years on local programming in the North West, from It's Trueman to Granada Reports. He also had a stint hosting Granada's film review show, Cinema, taking over from Michael Parkinson.

In 1951, in his youth, he appeared on stage for the Urmston Amateur Operatic Society (now the Urmston Musical Theatre) in a production of Merrie England, playing the role of Big Ben.

Filmography
 SuperTed - Pilot episode
 Chorlton and the Wheelies
 Jamie and the Magic Torch
 Cockleshell Bay
 The Wind in the Willows - Weasel Henchman, Otter, Additional voices
 The Treacle People
 Alias the Jester
 DangerMouse
 The Reluctant Dragon
 Count Duckula
 Victor and Hugo
 Truckers
 Budgie the Little Helicopter
 Thomas the Tank Engine & Friends - Writer (series 6 and 7 only)

References

External links
 
 http://www.rochellestevens.com/index.php?page=48&text=Brian_Trueman

1932 births
Living people
British male television writers
English children's writers
English male screenwriters
English male voice actors
English screenwriters
English television presenters
English television writers
Writers from Manchester